Desert Warrior or Desert Warriors may refer to:

Desert Warrior, or Los amantes del desierto, 1957 film starring Ricardo Montalban
Desert Warrior (film), English title of a 1958 Italian film
Tuareg – The Desert Warrior, 1984 Italian adventure-action film
Desert Warrior (1988 film), 1988 American post-nuclear action film by Jim Goldman, starring Lou Ferrigno and Shari Shattuck
Innocence of Muslims, or Desert Warriors, a 2012 film
Kimber Desert Warrior, a model of Kimber Custom gun
Desert Warriors, 2000 book by Russell Brown (author)
Desert Warrior, 1995 memoir of Saudi prince Khaled bin Sultan and Patrick Seale
Desert Warrior, horse that won the 1991 McDowell's Indian Derby
Desert Warrior, a Kuwaiti version of the Warrior tracked armoured vehicle
Desert Warrior, racing car built by Rally Raid UK, participating in numerous Dakar Rally events